Hadlow may refer to

Places
Hadlow, Kent
Hadlow Castle
St. Mary's Church, Hadlow
Hadlow Cricket Club
Hadlow College
Hadlow Down, East Sussex
St Mark's Church, Hadlow Down
Providence Chapel, Hadlow Down
Hadlow Road railway station, The Wirral
Hadlow, New Zealand, a locality near Timaru

People
Aaron Hadlow (b 1988) British professional kiteboarder
Janice Hadlow (b 1957) British television executive
Mark Hadlow (b 1957) New Zealand actor and comedian

Ships
, a ship that transported convicts to Australia
 Hadlow (HBC vessel), operated by the HBC from 1815-1817, see Hudson's Bay Company vessels